HobbyTown or HobbyTown USA is an American retail hobby, collectibles, and toy store chain headquartered in Lincoln, Nebraska. There are more than 100 HobbyTown franchise stores located in 39 states in U.S.

Beginning with the purchase of a local business by Merlin Hayes, Mary Hayes, and Thom Walla, HobbyTown was founded in 1980, incorporated in 1985, and began franchising in 1986. Most stores offer a full line of radio control hobbies, scale models, games, toys, educational items, paints, tools and model railroad items. The stores also carry seasonal items such as rockets, pinewood derby cars, educational toys, and kites. The website for HobbyTown provides E-commerce for customers worldwide.

History

Chick Bartlett's Hobby Town 

Charles "Chick" Bartlett (died 2012) opened Lincoln Hobby Supply on 23 February 1946, later advertised as the "first full-time hobby shop in Nebraska". His hobby business took the name Hobby Town in 1958. The store was located in the  Stuart Building in downtown Lincoln.

Great Race and Hobby Place 

Ron Justvig opened Great Race and Hobby Place in 1978, in Lincoln's Bethany neighborhood. It was later acquired by Merlin Hayes, Mary Hayes, and Thom Walla. A second Great Race store opened in south Lincoln in the early 1980s.

Hobby Town 

When Chick Bartlett retired in 1980, the Great Race owners bought his Hobby Town store and the brand name. The new owners began offering franchises in 1986. As of January 2022, Hobby Town had 111 units, all in the US.

References

External links
 

Companies based in Lincoln, Nebraska
Retail companies established in 1980
Toy retailers of the United States